NGC 1987 (also known as ESO 56-SC131) is an open cluster or a globular cluster located in the Mensa constellation and part of the Large Magellanic Cloud. It was discovered by John Herschel on November 3, 1834. Its apparent magnitude is 12.1, and its size is 1.7 arc minutes. It is thought to be around 600 million years old and has a significant number of red ageing stars.

References

External links
 

Open clusters
Large Magellanic Cloud
ESO objects
1987
Mensa (constellation)
Astronomical objects discovered in 1834
Discoveries by John Herschel